Upstate Shredding - Weitsman Recycling is an American scrap processing and recycling company headquartered in Owego, New York.

History 
Adam Weitsman, who founded Upstate Shredding in Owego, worked at the Manhattan Art Gallery. Later he set up his own American Folk Art Gallery in Greenwich village in 1991. Weitsman returned to his hometown after he lost his sister to cancer and joined his father in the family scrap metal business. He developed an interest in the processing side of scrap metal recycling.

In 1997, Weitsman opened Upstate Shredding on a 17-acre site at the Tioga County Industrial Park in Owego.

In 2005, Upstate Shredding purchased its sister company, Ben Weitsman & Son, Inc., after his father announced his retirement in 2005 and acquired a scrapyard in Solvay, NY in 2009.

In 2014, the company acquired Murtagh Scrap Handling, a scrap recycler based in Rome, New York. 

After receiving $1 million from the state of New York’s Empire State Development (ESD) fund, the company announced to open a media plant in Owego.

In 2015, Upstate Shredding bought a 5.6 million stake in Metalico Inc.a Cranford, New Jersey-based scrap metal processing company.

Various other acquisitions were held between the periods of 2012 - 2016, including acquisition of a scrap yard in New Castle, PA, a port facility in Albany, and Empire Recycling in Watertown which was later closed. By the end of 2016, they were collectively known as Upstate Shredding - Weitsman Recycling. 

The company has two facilities in Owego and Ithaca and operates in 17 locations across New York and Pennsylvania.

In 2019, the company made a donation to the American Cancer Society as part of its corporate social responsibility initiatives.

Controversy 
In May 2021, Sierra Club, an environmental organization based in Oakland, California, filed a suit against Weitsman alleging that the scrap recycler did not take adequate steps to protect against stormwater discharge from its facility in Albany, New York.

Awards 

 2012: Ranked as the 18th largest scrap metal processor in North America

 2015-16: Scrap Company of the Year from American Metal Market
 2016: Top scrap recycling firm in the world by Platts in London

References 

Metal companies of the United States
American companies established in 1997
Waste management companies of the United States